The Mountain is the eighth studio album by Steve Earle, backed by the Del McCoury Band, and released in 1999 (see 1999 in music).

The album was a significant departure from Earle's previous work, being the first wholly bluegrass album he had written. Earle made the album as a tribute to the founder of bluegrass music, Bill Monroe, who had died in 1996.

The album was nominated for a 2000 Grammy Award in the "Best Bluegrass Album" category (Earle's seventh Grammy nomination). Two tracks from the album were released as singles in the UK:  "Dixieland" (distributed to radio only) and "The Mountain" (a commercial release).

Emmylou Harris performed the song "Pilgrim" on The Late Show with Stephen Colbert on July 10, 2017.

A cover of the song The Graveyard Shift is featured on Wanda Jackson's 2012 album Unfinished Business.

Track listing
All tracks composed by Steve Earle

 "Texas Eagle"
 "Yours Forever Blue"
 "Carrie Brown"
 "I'm Still in Love With You" (Duet with Iris DeMent)
 "The Graveyard Shift"
 "Harlan Man"
 "The Mountain"
 "Outlaw's Honeymoon"
 "Connemara Breakdown"
 "Leroy's Dustbowl Blues"
 "Dixieland"
 "Paddy on the Beat"
 "Long, Lonesome Highway Blues"
 "Pilgrim"

Personnel
Steve Earle — guitar, vocal
Del McCoury —  guitar, vocal
Ronnie McCoury —  mandolin, vocal
Robbie McCoury —  banjo
Jason Carter —  fiddle
Mike Bub —  bass
Additional artists
Iris Dement - vocal (track 4)
Sam Bush - mandolin (track 14)
Jerry Douglas - resonator guitar (track 4, 14)
Stuart Duncan - fiddle (tracks 4, 9, 12)
Dan Gillis - tin whistle (track 11)
Gene Wooten - resonator guitar (tracks 7, 10)
 Tony Fitzpatrick - Album Artwork
Chorus on track 14
Meghann Ahern
Sam Bush
Kathy Chiavola
Cowboy Jack Clement
Dave Ferguson
Emmylou Harris
John Hartford
J.T. Huskey
Lisa Huskey
Benny Martin
Tim O'Brien
David Rawlings
Peter Rowan
Marty Stuart
Gillian Welch

Chart performance

References

1999 albums
Steve Earle albums
Del McCoury Band albums